Glenhayes is an unincorporated community in Wayne County, West Virginia, United States. Glenhayes had a post office, which closed on November 9, 2002.

The community's name is an amalgamation of James K. Glenn and Rutherford B. Hayes, the former a land speculator and the latter the 19th President of the United States.

References

Unincorporated communities in Wayne County, West Virginia
Unincorporated communities in West Virginia